The 2011 AMA Pro American Superbike Championship was the 36th running of the AMA Superbike Championship.  The championship covered 8 rounds beginning at Daytona International Speedway on March 11 and concluding at New Jersey Motorsports Park on September 4.  The champion was Josh Hayes riding a Yamaha.

Race calendar and results

  = World Superbike Weekend
  = MotoGP weekend

Championship standings

Riders' Championship

Manufacturers' Championship

Entry list

See also
 2011 AMA Pro Daytona Sportbike Championship

References

External links
The official website of the AMA Pro Racing Championship

Ama
Ama Pro American Superbike
AMA Superbike Championship seasons